Mirko Crepaldi (11 June 1972 – 28 December 2019) was an Italian racing cyclist. He rode in four editions of the Tour de France, one Giro d'Italia and three editions of the Vuelta a España.

Major results
1996
 9th HEW Cyclassics

Grand Tour general classification results timeline

References

External links
 

1972 births
2019 deaths
Italian male cyclists
Cyclists from the Province of Rovigo